Corser is a surname, and may refer to:

 Bernard Corser, (1882–1967) Australian politician
 Edward Corser, (1852–1928) Australian politician
 Frederick Corser, (1849–1924) American architect
 Rodger Corser, (born 1973) Australian actor
 Thomas Corser, (1793–1876) British clergyman
 Troy Corser, (born 1971) Australian motorcycle racer